Mansonia altissima is a species of tree native to western and Central Africa. It has the vernacular names of;
African black walnut or African walnut.

Distribution
Mansonia altissima ranges across west-central Africa, including parts of Benin, Cameroon, Central African Republic, Republic of the Congo, Ghana, Ivory Coast, Liberia, Nigeria, and Togo.

A subspecies, Mansonia altissima var. altissima, is native to disturbed areas and forest clearings in lowland moist forests. Its range includes portions of  Côte d'Ivoire, Ghana, Benin, Nigeria, Cameroon, and Republic of the Congo. It is experiencing habitat loss and fragmentation across its range, and is considered Endangered.

References

Flora of West Tropical Africa
Afrotropical realm flora
Helicteroideae
Taxa named by Auguste Chevalier